Firebug is the name of three DC Comics supervillains.

Publication history
The Joe Rigger version of Firebug debuted in Batman #318 and was created by Len Wein and Irv Novick.

The Harlan Combs version of Firebug debuted in Gotham Central #3 and was created by Ed Brubaker and Michael Lark.

The unnamed Firebug debuted in Deadshot (vol. 2) #1 and was created by Christos Gage Steven Cummings.

Fictional character biographies

Joe Rigger
Firebug first appeared in Batman #318 (December 1979). Joe Rigger was a soldier and demolitions expert who returned to Gotham City when his family had been killed in three separate building-related accidents. His sanity slipping, Rigger vowed that those buildings would not kill again. Using his military training and a costume containing tanks of napalm, he became the Firebug and set out to burn all three buildings to the ground. He was defeated by Batman atop the towering Gotham State Building, and believed dead after his tank exploded.

Firebug reappeared some time later, taking on a mission from the Calculator to invade Hero Hotline's HQ, but was disarmed and defeated by the Hotline members.

Still later, Firebug escaped Blackgate Prison and applied for membership in Black Mask's gang, but was beaten by his rival arsonist, Firefly. He subsequently attempted to prove he was a better arsonist, and again appeared to be killed by his own inferno. He was later revealed to have survived. His close brush with death along with the scarring it caused prompted him to sell his Firebug costume and gear and leave the life of crime. He briefly helped the Gotham City Police Department apprehend Harlan Combs.

In The New 52, Firebug is reintroduced when he is hired by an unknown party to blow-up several Gotham buildings to lure and kill Batgirl. She survives the attempt and tracks down Firebug. Upon his arrest, Firebug claims his employers will not allow an incarceration.

Harlan Combs
A new Firebug debuted in Gotham Central #3. At first, his identity was a mystery and he was wanted in the murder of a teenage girl who was killed after a babysitting job. Eventually, the Gotham police deduced that the culprit was Harlan Combs, the father of the child she was sitting and by all accounts a perfectly normal man. Combs had purchased the Firebug costume and armor from Rigger. He was injured fleeing the police and was quickly arrested where Rigger helped with his apprehension.

Unnamed
An unnamed character using the name Firebug debuted in Deadshot - Urban Renewal #1 (February 2005). He had won the name and costume from an Internet auction. After taking on the Firebug name, he enters the costume business.

Firebug later appeared in a flashback revealing that he teamed up with Mr. Freeze, but was defeated by the team of Batman and Harvey Dent prior to Batman leaving Gotham City for a year.

In other media
Firebug was the second-to-last boss, preceding Joker, in the NES Batman game, loosely based on the 1989 film. He, Killer Moth, and Electrocutioner are supervillains working as thugs for the Joker. Firebug serves as the Joker's bodyguard, and wants revenge on Batman for defeating his brother. He could run at high speeds, punch rapidly, and throw giant fireballs from his hands.

Firebug was mentioned in Batman: Arkham Knight. Since the villain Firefly is in Gotham City, a militia thug suggests that there is a "Firebug" too.

See also
 List of Batman family enemies

References

External links
 Firebug (Joseph Rigger) at DC Comics Wiki
 Firebug (Harlan Combs) at DC Comics Wiki
 Firebug III at DC Comics Wiki
 Firebug at Comic Vine

Characters created by Christos Gage
Characters created by Ed Brubaker
Characters created by Len Wein
Comics characters introduced in 1979
Comics characters introduced in 2003
Comics characters introduced in 2005
DC Comics supervillains
Fictional soldiers